Raymond Seopa (born 14 April 1975, in South Africa) is a South African professional footballer, who last played for South African Premier Division club Supersport United as a forward.

References 

1975 births
Living people
Association football forwards
South African soccer players
SuperSport United F.C. players